ManyVids is a Canadian adult entertainment video hosting, live streaming, and e-commerce company headquartered in Montreal, Quebec, Canada.

History 
ManyVids was co-founded in 2014 by CEO Bella French, a former webcam model and adult online content creator. French also held the title of chief financial officer until 2017. The ManyVids office is located in Montreal, Quebec, Canada. No adult content is filmed in the ManyVids office.

ManyVids publishes MV Mag, an adult magazine that showcases professional erotic photosets, interviews with celebrities, adult entertainers and content-creators, and fantasy stories. The magazine is free for site members and content creators. The ManyVids YouTube series has mainstream, original content that is safe for work, which is often comic.

Business model
ManyVids' allows adult entertainment content creators to produce, promote and distribute their own content while retaining full copyright to their work. They are able to upload videos and pictures for members to purchase and download. They can also run an online shop, offer paid memberships, sell texting and phone call services, and set up crowdsourcing campaigns. Members are able to leave tips and unlock special statuses while interacting with the content-creators in real time.

Celebrity partnerships 
The MV Podcast is a live show starring trans comedian Tranna, which has run for a total of three seasons. The show is based on hour long interviews with camgirls and pornstars that allow insight into the lives of sex-workers.

In September 2017, ManyVids teamed up with American model and activist Amber Rose in support of The Amber Rose SlutWalk, a nonprofit advocacy organization that works to end slut-shaming and to advocate for women’s empowerment and LGBTQ rights. Rose was the first celebrity to appear live on the MV Takeover platform.

In November 2017, ManyVids named American television personality Farrah Abraham their newest MV Ambassador to promote sex positivity.

In May 2018, ManyVids partnered with actress, model, and reality television participant Coco Austin on a live MV Takeover event in addition to exclusive photo sets and interview appearing in MV Magazine.

In September 2018, ManyVids featured American rapper Brooke Candy on the cover of their magazine's Sexual Empowerment issue. ManyVids sponsored Candy's 'My Sex' music video.

Campaigns and philanthropy 
In November 2017, ManyVids launched the We Are Many campaign to help raise awareness of the issue of abuse against sex workers. The campaign culminated with a donation of US$11,800 to the Sex Workers Outreach Project-USA to help them end violence against sex workers.

In December 2017, ManyVids donated US$5,000 to the Association of Sites Advocating Child Protection to demonstrate the adult industry's commitment to helping parents prevent children from viewing age-inappropriate content.

Industry recognition
In 2018, ManyVids was nominated for 3 XBIZ Awards: Progressive Web Company of the Year, Emerging Web Brand of the Year and Clip Site of the Year. They won the award for Clip Site of the Year; two of the company’s founders were on hand to accept the award.

In 2019, ManyVids was recognised as the Global Web Brand of the Year at the XBIZ Europa Awards.

In 2022, ManyVids won the XBIZ Award for "Creator Platform of the Year".

See also
Internet pornography
List of chat websites
List of most popular websites
List of video hosting services
OnlyFans
Porn 2.0

References

External links
 

Canadian erotica and pornography websites
Companies based in Montreal
Internet properties established in 2014
Video hosting